The 2001 Cork Senior Hurling Championship was the 113th staging of the Cork Senior Hurling Championship since its establishment by the Cork County Board in 1887. The draw for the 2001 opening round fixtures took place in December 2000. The championship ended on 6 October 2001.

Newtownshandrum entered the championship as the defending champions, however, they were defeated by Imokilly in the semi-final.

On 6 October 2001, Blackrock won the championship following a 4-08 to 2-07 defeat of Imokilly in the final. This was their 31st championship title and their first in two championship seasons.

Newtownshandrum's Ben O'Connor was the championship's top scorer with 6-29.

Team changes

To Championship

Promoted from the Cork Intermediate Hurling Championship
 Douglas

Results

Preliminary round

First round

Second round

Third round

Quarter-finals

Semi-finals

Final

Championship statistics

Top scorers

Overall

In a single game

External links
Official GAA Website

References

Cork Senior Hurling Championship
Cork Senior Hurling Championship